"Where Is My Mind?" is a song by the American alternative rock band Pixies, and it is the seventh track on the band's 1988 debut album Surfer Rosa. It is one of the band's signature songs, and has inspired a multitude of covers. The song was featured on the 2021 version of Rolling Stone magazine's 500 Greatest Songs of All Time, ranked at No. 493.

Background 
The song was written by frontman Black Francis while he attended the University of Massachusetts Amherst, inspired by his experiences while scuba diving in the Caribbean. He later said he had "this very small fish trying to chase me. I don't know why—I don't know too much about fish behavior."

Guitarist Joey Santiago composed the song's guitar line. He recalled of his part, "This was actually the first thing I tried. A lazy potato that instantly sounded strong and hooky."

Cultural impact 
After being featured in the 1999 film Fight Club (in which the song plays over the final scene), the song gained an even wider audience.
"Where Is My Mind?" was voted number 29 in the "Hottest 100 of All Time" music poll conducted by Australian radio station Triple J in 2009. Over half a million votes were cast in the poll.

On April 13, 2004, NASA used "Where Is My Mind?" to wake up the team working on the Mars rover, Spirit, in honor of its software transplant.

Criminal Minds featured the song on an episode titled Sex, Birth, Death. A xylophone version of the song was used in episode titled "The Lesson".

In 2016 an all-kazoo version of the song was used in The Tick episode "Where's My Mind."

Mr. Nobody, a film released in 2009 also featured the song. HBO drama The Leftovers featured both the Pixies version and Maxence Cyrin's piano cover in the show's second season. Cyrin's cover of the song has also been featured on Mr. Robot and It's Kind of a Funny Story. Cyrin's cover was also featured in the "Man Behind The Treasure" promo for the PlayStation 4 game Uncharted 4: A Thief's End.

Other movies that use the song include Gaz Bar Blues, Big Ass Spider! (version by Storm Large), Knock Knock, Sucker Punch (version by Yoav) and the series Warehouse 13 (version by Allison Scagliotti, episode 3x6).

End of Fashion have been criticized for their uncredited copying of the guitar riff from "Where Is My Mind?", for their song "O Yeah". For example, Rockus Online Magazine reviewer Jonathon Miller called the song "disturbingly Pixies-ish" and went on to write:
End of Fashion are having no problem appealing to the 95% of people that haven't heard (and still remember) the Pixies' "Where Is My Mind?" and have never experienced a truly exciting live show, and if that's what the band is aiming for, then they are a complete success.

All Elite Wrestling's Orange Cassidy and Best Friends first used "Where Is My Mind?" as their new entrance theme in March 2021. AEW CEO Tony Khan signed a multiyear agreement to use the song and said, “every use of the song in AEW will live in our content library forever in perpetuity.”

In a Cracked article titled "How 'Where Is My Mind' Became Hollywood's Laziest Trope," the repeated use of the song has been criticized as "shorthand for telling you that a character has issues telling the difference between what's real and what isn't—especially if multiple personalities are involved."

A live version of the song recorded at 2004's Coachella was released free through BitTorrent.

Cover versions
Nada Surf covered the song on the 1999 Pixies tribute album Where Is My Mind?: A Tribute to the Pixies.
Tkay Maidza's 2021 cover version was used in a 2023 Apple AirPods commercial.
Preteen Nandi Bushell recorded the song in 2021, earning praise from the Pixies.
Kelly Clarkson covered the song in 2021 on her "Kellyoke" segment.
Members of the punk bands Touché Amoré, PUP, Vein.fm, and Twitching Tongues joined wrestler Orange Cassidy for a 2021 punk cover.

Weekly charts

Certifications

References

External links 
 Pixies "Where Is My Mind" lyrics

Pixies (band) songs
1988 songs
Songs written by Black Francis
Song recordings produced by Steve Albini